Bart Aernouts (born 23 June 1982 in Essen) is a Belgian former professional cyclist who competed mainly in cyclo-cross races. Aernouts often finished only a few places behind big names such as Sven Nys, Niels Albert and Zdeněk Štybar, but occasionally managed top results in high calibre races of the Gazet van Antwerpen Trophy or the Superprestige.

He achieved his major wins in Sint-Michielsgestel, where he won both the Junior UCI Cyclo-cross World Championships in 2000 and the Cyclo-cross Sint-Michielsgestel in 2010.

Aernouts announced his retirement from professional cyclocross in February 2015 after illness curtailed his 2014–15 season.

References

External links

1982 births
Living people
Belgian male cyclists
Cyclo-cross cyclists
People from Essen, Belgium
Cyclists from Antwerp Province